The Bangkok−Ban Chang Motorway, designated Motorway Route 7, is a motorway in Thailand, connecting Bangkok to Chonburi, Pattaya, and Map Ta Phut. The country's first intercity motorway, it is part of the Asian Highway Network as AH Route 19 and AH Route 123. An extension between Pong and Map Tha Put opened in May 2020. It is part of the transport network development project in the eastern seaboard.

Routes

Main route
Motorway Route 7, in the beginning, was called Bangkok–Chonburi Road or Bangkok–Chonburi Road New Line. It is an eight-lane intercity-motorway and originates in Si Rat Expressway Section D and Rama IX Road at the Sri Nagarindra Interchange in Suan Luang District, heading Eastern Thailand. It crosses Saphan Sung District, Prawet District, and intersects Kanchanaphisek Road (Motorway Route 9) at the Thap Chang Interchange in Prawet District, and Rom Klao Road (National Route 3119) at the Rom Klao Interchange in Lat Krabang District, and on through Samut Prakan Province, Chachoengsao Province and finally Chonburi Province at the Khiri Nakhon Interchange in Mueang Chonburi District.

The second section, is called Chonburi–Pattaya Road. It is on through Si Racha District, connecting Laem Chabang at the Nong Kham Interchange. This section originating from Bangkok to this area is part of Asian Highway 19 (AH19) and another section originating from this area to Pattaya is part of Asian Highway 123. In this section, it is six-lane intercity-motorway and intersects National Route 36 at the Pattaya Interchange, and finally terminates in Sukhumvit Road (National Route 3) in Map Ta Phut, Rayong.

Spur routes
The spur routes connect between main route and the economic area, also National Routes including Sukhumvit Road. This routes heading to coasts are planned as the semi-controlled access motorway. The spur routes branches from Motorway Route 7 are:

Motorway−Bang Woa Spur Route, connecting between Motorway Route 7 to Debaratna Road.
Motorway−Chonburi Spur Route, connecting between Motorway Route 7 to National Route 361.
Motorway−Laem Chabang Spur Route, connecting between Motorway Route 7 to Laem Chabang Port.
Motorway−Pattaya Spur Route, connecting between Motorway Route 7 to Sukhumvit Road.
Motorway−Ban Amphoe Spur Route, connecting between Motorway Route 7 to Sukhumvit Road.

Frontage routes
The frontage routes are the local roads running parallel to motorway route 7. They are designated as National Route both left and right route. The left route is Thailand Route 3701 and Thailand Route 3702.

List of facilities

Toll rates
These are toll rates of Motorway Route 7 in 9 tollgates. The toll rates is in Thai Baht (4 wheels/6 wheels/over 6 wheels).

References

Controlled-access highways in Thailand